El Dorado State Park is a state park in Butler County, Kansas, United States, located just north of El Dorado.

The largest of Kansas' state parks, El Dorado is nestled in the scenic Flint Hills and sprawls across 4,000 acres (16 km²) along the eastern and western shores of El Dorado Reservoir. Crappie and largemouth bass fishing are good in standing timber and around fish attractors. Walleye fishing is good along the face of the dam and on the old railroad bed. Channel catfish is good lakewide, as well as in the river below the outlet. Flathead fishing is good in a variety of areas, especially Old Bluestem Lake.

Regarded as one of the state's most handicapped accessible parks, El Dorado contains 1,100 campsites which offer visitors a range of choices. Other facilities include two swimming beaches, 10 group shelters, and a 24-site group campground. A large amphitheater accommodates a variety of concerts and festivals. Trail users will find a variety of attractions, including a designated horse campground.

See also
 List of Kansas state parks
 List of lakes, reservoirs, and dams in Kansas
 List of rivers of Kansas

References

External links

Protected areas of Butler County, Kansas
State parks of Kansas